Los Ausoles is a group of hot springs located 20 kilometers north of Ahuachapán in El Salvador. The area has been described as "the capital of Central American geothermal." Many of the springs in the area produce heavy steam, and as of 1850, were described as "semi-fluid mass of mud and water in a state of ebullition, continually throwing large heavy bubbles to the surfaces; this heated mass is in some black, in others red, or of the ochry colour."

There are many hot springs in the area, however, there are five main springs:

El Zapote is a crater approximately 20 meters in diameter
 Valdivieso is approximately 20 meters in diameter and comprises 4 different openings. It is known for its blue colored sulfur.
El Barreal comprises mud ponds. 
La Labor is approximately 200 meters in diameter. It has seven openings with strong smells and noise, and clay and mud geysers.
El Salitre is a hot water lagoon.

References

Ahuachapán Department
Hot springs of North America
Bodies of water of El Salvador
Bodies of water of Central America